Xyleutes desdemona is a moth in the family Cossidae first described by Harrison Gray Dyar Jr. and William Schaus in 1937. It is found in the Brazilian state of Espírito Santo.

References

Xyleutes
Moths described in 1937